Mordellistena comata is a beetle in the genus Mordellistena of the family Mordellidae. It was described in 1858 by John Lawrence LeConte.

References

comata
Beetles described in 1858